Ajax may refer to:

Greek mythology and tragedy
 Ajax the Great, a Greek mythological hero, son of King Telamon and Periboea
 Ajax the Lesser, a Greek mythological hero, son of Oileus, the king of Locris
 Ajax (play), by the ancient Greek tragedian Sophocles, about Ajax the Great

Arts and entertainment

Fictional characters
 Ajax Duckman, in the animated television series Duckman
 Marvel Comics:
 Ajax the Greater, another name for Ajak, one of the Eternals from Marvel Comics
 Ajax the Lesser, another name for Arex, one of the Eternals from Marvel Comics
 Ajax, a member of the Pantheon appearing in  Marvel Comics
 Ajax (Francis Fanny), a fictional supervillain first appearing in Deadpool #14
 Martian Manhunter, a DC Comics superhero called Ajax in Brazil and Portugal
 Ajax, a Call of Duty: Black Ops 4 operative
 Ajax, from the video game Genshin Impact

Music
 A-Jax (band), a South Korean boy band
 Ajax (band), an electronic music band from New York City
 Ajax (opera), by the French composer Toussaint Bertin de la Doué
 DJ Ajax (1971-2013; born Adrian Thomas), an Australian electro mashup DJ
 Lisa Ajax (born 1998), Swedish singer
 "Ajax" (song), a song by Tante Leen, 1969
 Ajax Records, a former North American record company

Other arts and entertainment
 Ajax (painting), a painting by John Steuart Curry
 Ajax (Disney), a fictional company (the Disney equivalent of Looney Tunes' Acme Corporation)
 Ajax, a Superman robot used by Wonder Man to hide his identity

Computing
 Ajax (floppy disk controller), a floppy disk controller fitted to the Atari STE
 Ajax (programming), Asynchronous JavaScript and XML, a method used in web application development, and a software framework for it

Places

Canada
 Ajax (electoral district), in the Durham Region of Ontario
 Ajax (provincial electoral district), in Ontario
 Ajax, Ontario, a town in the Greater Toronto Area

United States
 Ajax, Louisiana, an unincorporated community
 Ajax, Missouri, a ghost town
 Ajax Peak, a summit near Telluride, Colorado
 Ajax, South Dakota, an unincorporated community
 Ajax, Utah, a ghost town
 Ajax, Virginia, an unincorporated community
 Ajax, West Virginia, an unincorporated community
 Aspen Mountain (Colorado), also known as Ajax Mountain

Elsewhere
 Mount Ajax, part of the Admiralty Mountains, Victoria Land, Antarctic
 1404 Ajax, an asteroid

People
 Ajax (missionary), Arian missionary who converted the Suevi to Christianity ( 466)
 Ajax, pen name of Sidney William Jackson (1873–1946), Australian naturalist and ornithologist
 Ajax, nickname of Heinrich Bleichrodt (1909–1977), German World War II U-boat commander

Sport

Association football, soccer
 AFC Ajax, a football club in Amsterdam, Netherlands
 Ajax Cape Town F.C., a South African football club
 Ajax Futebol Clube, a Brazilian football club
 Ajax de Ouenzé, a Congolese football club
 FC Ajax Lasnamäe, an Estonian football club
 Ajax Orlando Prospects, American soccer team from Orlando, Florida, a.k.a. Ajax America
 Ajax America Women, American women's soccer team from California
 Aias Salamina F.C., a football club in Salamina, Greece
 Ajax Sportsman Combinatie, a cricket and football club in Leiden, Netherlands
 Rabat Ajax F.C., a Maltese football club
 Unión Ájax, a football club in Trujillo, Honduras
 Voetbal Vereniging Ajax, a Surinamese football club

Other sports
 Ajax Kenitra, a Moroccan futsal (indoor football) club
 Ajax København, a Danish handball team
 Ajax (horse) (born 1901), a French Champion racehorse
 Ajax II (born 1934), an Australian Champion racehorse

Military
 , several ships of the Royal Navy
 , several ships of the US Navy
 General Dynamics Ajax, a family of armoured fighting vehicles for the British Army
 Operation Ajax, the 1953 Iranian coup d'état

Transport
 Ajax (1906 automobile), a Swiss automobile
 Ajax (1913 automobile), a French automobile by the American Briscoe brothers
 Ajax (1914 automobile), an American automobile by Ajax Motors Co. of Seattle, Washington
 Ajax (1921 automobile), an American prototype that was not produced
 Ajax (Nash Motors), an automobile brand of Nash Motors, 1925–1926
 Ajax (locomotive), several train locomotives
 Ajax (motorcycle), manufactured in England between 1923 and 1924
 Ajax (crane barge), a floating crane used to install the Panama Canal locks
 Ajax (ship), various ships
 Ajax GO Station, a  train and bus station in Ajax, Ontario, Canada
 Ajax Motors Co., an American carmaker, manufacturer of the Ajax (1914 automobile)

Other uses
 Ajax (cleaning product), a brand of household cleaning products
 AFC Ajax N.V., a sports company associated with AFC Ajax
 Kanichee Mine, Temagami, Ontario, also known as Ajax Mine
 Ajax High School, a public high school in Ajax, Ontario, Canada
 AJAX furnace, a type of open hearth furnace

See also
 
 
 Nike Ajax, the world's first operational surface-to-air missile
 Ayaks, a hypersonic waverider aircraft program started in the Soviet Union